Lamont is a town in central Alberta, Canada.

History 
Settlement began in the 1880s. The area's location along the Victoria Trail, which was used by travellers between Edmonton and Winnipeg through most of the 1800s, aided the area's growing prosperity. This Victoria Trail was a road that ran south of the river, the so-called "plain [plains] trail." (A better known alternative route under the same name ran along the north bank and is now memorialized by the Victoria Trail in Edmonton.)

The town was named in honour of Canadian politician John Henderson Lamont.

The Lamont Hospital opened in 1912, serving the entire region.

On November 29, 1960, a school bus carrying students from nearby Chipman to school in Lamont was struck by a train, killing 17 students (15 girls and two boys). The collision occurred on the east side of town at a crossing just north of Highway 15 before 9:00 am.

Demographics 

In the 2016 Census of Population conducted by Statistics Canada, the Town of Lamont recorded a population of 1,774 living in 664 of its 695 total private dwellings, a  change from its 2011 population of 1,753.

Media 
The Lamont Leader is a weekly newspaper that serves Lamont.

Notable people 
 Gene Achtymichuk, former professional hockey player
 Brian O'Kurley, former member of Canadian Parliament
 Ed Stelmach, Premier of Alberta, 2006-2011

See also 
List of communities in Alberta
List of towns in Alberta

References

External links 

1910 establishments in Alberta
Towns in Alberta